This is a timeline of the history of athletics on television in the UK.

1930s to 1970s 
 No events.

1980s 
 1980
 No events.
 1981
 29 March – The BBC covers the inaugural London Marathon although coverage is restricted to the final part of the race.
 1982
 29 March – The BBC covers the Great North Run for the first time, providing live coverage of the start and the end of the race. However it didn't cover the event again until the mid 1990s.
 1983
 7–14 August – The BBC, ITV and Channel 4 show the first World Athletics Championships.
 1984
 13 May – The BBC broadcasts full live coverage of the London Marathon for the first time.
 1985
 ITV takes over as broadcaster of UK athletics meetings. It also begins to cover European meetings in addition to the major international athletics events. Some of the coverage is shown on Channel 4, especially for midweek European meetings whereby Channel 4 shows the second hour of coverage.
 1986
 No events.
 1987
 28 August-6 September – ITV shows the World Athletics Championships for the second and final time. Some coverage is also shown on Channel 4, which does not show the event again until 2011.
 1988
 No events.
 1989
 Eurosport launches and its output includes extensive coverage of European athletics meetings.

1990s 
 1990
 27 August-2 September – ITV broadcasts a major athletics championships for the final time when, in conjunction with Channel 4, it broadcasts the 1990 European Athletics Championships.
 1991
 23 August-1 September – Eurosport broadcasts the World Athletics Championships for the first time. Terrestrial coverage is now shown exclusively by the BBC, which broadcasts morning-long coverage of the evening events.
 1992
 No events.
 1993
 13–22 August – For the first time, UK viewers are able to see full live coverage of the morning events of the World Athletics Championships. The full morning event coverage is only broadcast on Eurosport although the BBC does broadcast some morning live coverage.
 1994
 7–14 August – Eurosport provides UK viewers with live coverage of the morning events from the European Athletics Championships for the first time as again the BBC had only covered the evening events live and in full.
 1995
 No events.
 1996
 ITV shows athletics coverage for the final time. It had slowly been reducing its coverage of the sport since the start of the 1990s.
 1997
 Channel 4 takes over as broadcaster of domestic athletics, doing so for this season and the following season before the rights move to the BBC in 1999. 
 1–10 August – For the first time, the BBC provides full live morning coverage of the morning events of the World Athletics Championships.
 1998
 18–23 August – For the first time, the BBC provides full live morning coverage of the morning events of the European Athletics Championships.
 1999
 May – Domestic athletics returns to the BBC after more than a decade.

2000s 
 No events.

2010s
2010
 12–14 March – ESPN broadcasts the 2010 World Indoor Athletic Championships.
2011
 Channel 5 broadcasts the Great Birmingham Run and Great South Run for the first time.
 27 August-4 September – Channel 4 shows live coverage of the 2011 World Championships in Athletics but due to the broadcaster's decision to focus on Paralympic Sports, Channel 4 decides not to show the 2013 event even though it had bought the rights to the 2013 championships.
2012
 9–11 March – Channel 4 shows live coverage of the 2012 World Indoor Athletic Championships.
2013
 20–28 July – The World Para Athletics Championships are broadcast on UK television for the first time when Channel 4's sister channel More4 broadcasts over five hours of live coverage daily throughout the Championship. More4 also broadcasts the 2015 Championships.
 10–18 August – Coverage of the World Athletics Championships returns to the BBC.
2014
 7–9 March – The IAAF World Indoor Championships return to the BBC, having been with other broadcasters for the past few events.
 19–23 August – The IPC European Athletics Championships 2014 are broadcast on UK television for the first time when Channel 4's sister channel More4 screens full live coverage of the event.
2015
 No events.
2016
 No events.
2017
 14–23 July – Channel 4 broadcasts full live coverage of the 2017 World Para Athletics Championships with the previous producer of Channel 4's athletics coverage, Sunset + Vine, being host broadcaster for the championships.
2018
 14–15 July – Sky Sports broadcasts live coverage of the inaugural Athletics World Cup.
2019
 No events.

2020s
 2020
 No events.
 2021
 29 January-24 February – The BBC shows the 2021 World Athletics Indoor Tour.
 23 May – Live coverage of the Diamond League returns to the BBC following an agreement which will see the athletics series broadcast live on the BBC for the next four years.

References

athletics on UK television
athletics on UK television
athletics on UK television
Sports television in the United Kingdom
athletics on UK television
Athletics in the United Kingdom